Secret room or secret rooms may refer to:

Architecture and engineering 
 Hidden room or secret room, rooms in buildings or underground often accessed through secret passages
 Smaller hidden storage places for valuables and personal belongings:
 in furniture (see Cabinetry#Compartments),
 in vehicles (see Trap (car)), or
 in various other devices (see Concealment device)

Literature and media 
 Secret Room, a 2013 Nigerian thriller film starring OC Ukeje and Linda Ejiofor
 The Secret Room, a 1969 novel by Marion Eames